Dejdamrong Sor Amnuaysirichoke (born November 7, 1978) is a Thai former mixed martial artist who has competed in ONE Championship, where he competed in the strawweight division. He is a former ONE Strawweight World Champion, being the inaugural titleholder, and is considered to be one of the most successful Thai mixed martial artists, having become the first Thai to win an MMA world title.

Prior to mixed martial arts, Dejdamrong was a Muay Thai fighter with 350 fights who won multiple Lumpinee Stadium titles in three different weight classes.

Aside from competing in mixed martial arts, Dejdamrong is also an instructor at the Evolve MMA gym based in Singapore.

Muay Thai career
Amnuaysirichoke competed in Muay Thai for over 20 years, and was a three-division Lumpinee Stadium champion at mini flyweight, light flyweight, and flyweight; and amassed an unofficial record of 282-65-3.  He retired in 2007.

Mixed martial arts career

ONE Championship

2014–2016: Early career & ONE Strawweight World Champion
Amnuaysirichoke began his professional MMA career in 2014 for ONE Fighting Championship. On June 14, 2014, Dejdamrong made his debut at ONE FC: Era of Champions, where he defeated Jomanz Omanz by first-round TKO.

He started out undefeated at 6–0, including a win over Roy Doliguez on May 22, 2015 to claim the ONE Strawweight World Championship, becoming the most successful Thai mixed martial artist and first Thai world champion in MMA. Dejdamrong was the ONE World Champion for over a year before losing the title to Yoshitaka Naito on May 27, 2016. Since losing the Strawweight World Title, Dejdamrong has gone 5–4 in ONE Championship.

2017
On March 11, 2017, he lost to future ONE Strawweight World Champion Joshua Pacio by split decision at ONE Championship: Warrior Kingdom.

On May 26, 2017, Dejdamrong defeated Adrian Mattheis by first-round KO at ONE Championship: Dynasty of Heroes.

On August 18, 2017, he stopped Robin Catalan by TKO in the second round at ONE Championship: Quest for Greatness.

On December 9, 2017, Dejdamrong lost to Riku Shibuya by second-round submission via guillotine choke at ONE Championship: Warriors of the World.

2018
Dejdamrong then lost to Jeremy Miado by first-round KO on March 24, 2018 at ONE Championship: Iron Will.

He would bounce back with a second-round submission victory over Himanshu Kaushik via rear-naked choke on November 9, 2018 at ONE Championship: Heart of the Lion.

2019
Dejdamrong faced Jeremy Miado in a rematch on February 22, 2019 at ONE Championship: Call to Greatness. This time, he was able to secure a second-round TKO victory.

He then faced Miao Li Tao on May 17, 2019 at ONE Championship: Enter the Dragon, where he lost by first-round knockout.

Nevertheless, Dejdamrong was able to close out 2019 on a high note with a third-round TKO victory over Muhammad Imran on November 22, 2019 at ONE Championship: Edge Of Greatness.

2020
Dejdamrong competed only once in 2020. On October 10, 2020, he faced Hexi Getu at ONE Championship: Reign of Dynasties. After getting dominated on the ground over three rounds, he lost by split decision.

2021
Dejdamrong is scheduled to face Banma Duoji at ONE Championship: Battleground 3 on August 27, 2021. He won by technical knockout in the second round.

2022
Dejdamrong faced Danial Williams at ONE: Bad Blood on February 11, 2022. He lost after a liver punch stopped the bout in the second round.

Retirement
Following his fight with Williams, Dejdamrong announced his retirement on Instagram.

Championships and accomplishments

Mixed martial arts
ONE Championship
ONE Strawweight World Championship (One time)

Muay Thai
Lumpinee Stadium 
2× Lumpinee Stadium Strawweight (105 lbs) Champion (1999)
Lumpinee Stadium Light Flyweight (108 lbs) Champion (2002)

Siam Omnoi Stadium 
 2006 Omnoi Stadium Champion
 2006 Shell Rimula Tournament Winner

Mixed martial arts record

|-
|Loss
|align=center|12–7
| Danial Williams
| KO (punch to the body) 
| ONE: Bad Blood
| 
|align=center| 2
|align=center| 1:35
| Kallang, Singapore
| 
|-
| Win
| align=center|12–6
|Banma Duoji 
|TKO (elbows and knees)
| ONE: Battleground 3
| 
| align=center| 2
| align=center| 3:31
| Kallang, Singapore
|
|-
| Loss
| align=center|11–6
|Hexi Getu 
|Decision (split) 
| ONE: Reign of Dynasties
| 
| align=center| 3
| align=center| 5:00
| Kallang, Singapore
|
|-
| Win
| align=center|11–5
|Muhammad Imran
|TKO (knees and punches)
| ONE: Edge Of Greatness
| 
| align=center| 3
| align=center| 1:21
| Kallang, Singapore
|
|-
| Loss
| align=center|10–5
|Miao Li Tao
|KO (punch)
| ONE: Enter the Dragon
| 
| align=center| 1
| align=center| 4:09
| Kallang, Singapore
|
|-
| Win
| align=center|10–4
|Jeremy Miado
|TKO (knees)
| ONE: Call to Greatness
| 
| align=center| 2
| align=center| 2:38
| Kallang, Singapore
|
|-
| Win
| align=center|9–4
|Himanshu Kaushik
|Submission (rear-naked choke)
| ONE: Heart of the Lion
| 
| align=center| 2
| align=center| 4:45
| Kallang, Singapore
|
|-
| Loss
| align=center|8–4
|Jeremy Miado
|KO (punch)
| ONE: Iron Will
| 
| align=center| 1
| align=center| 1:21
| Bangkok, Thailand
|
|-
| Loss
| align=center|8–3
|Riku Shibuya
|Submission (guillotine choke)
| ONE: Warriors of the World
|
| align=center| 1
| align=center| 2:36
| Bangkok, Thailand
|  
|-
| Win
| align=center|8–2
|Robin Catalan
|TKO (knees)
| ONE: Quest for Greatness
|
| align=center| 2
| align=center| 0:46
| Kuala Lumpur, Malaysia
|
|-
| Win
| align=center|7–2
|Adrian Mattheis
|KO (punch)
| ONE: Dynasty of Heroes
|
| align=center| 1
| align=center| 4:26
| Kallang, Singapore
|
|-
|  Loss
| align=center|6–2
| Joshua Pacio
| Decision (split)
| ONE: Warrior Kingdom
|
| align=center| 3
| align=center| 5:00
| Bangkok, Thailand
|
|-
|  Loss
| align=center|6–1
| Yoshitaka Naito
| Submission (rear-naked choke)
| ONE: Kingdom of Champions
| 
| align=center| 4
| align=center| 4:00
| Bangkok, Thailand
| Lost ONE Strawweight Championship
|-
|  Win
| align=center|6–0
| Yago Bryan
| Decision (unanimous)
| ONE: Pride of Lions
| 
| align=center| 5
| align=center| 5:00
| Kallang, Singapore
| Originally a title fight but changed to non title after Bryan missed weight
|-
|  Win
| align=center|5–0
| Roy Doliguez
| Technical Decision (unanimous)
| ONE: Warrior's Quest
| 
| align=center| 5
| align=center| 3:29
| Kallang, Singapore
| <small>Won inaugural ONE Strawweight Championship. Strawweight (115 lb) debut.
|-
|  Win
| align=center|4–0
| Rene Catalan
| KO (knee)
| ONE FC: Warrior's Way
| 
| align=center| 1
| align=center| 2:30
| Manila, Philippines
|
|-
|  Win
| align=center|3–0
| Saiful Merican
| Submission (armbar)
| ONE FC: Roar of the Tigers
| 
| align=center| 2
| align=center| 2:12
| Kuala Lumpur, Malaysia
| 
|-
|  Win
| align=center|2–0
| Ali Yaakub
| Submission (rear naked choke)
| ONE FC: Reign of Champions
| 
| align=center| 1
| align=center| 2:34
| Dubai, United Arab Emirates
|
|-
| Win
| align=center| 1–0
| Jomanz Omanz
| TKO (knees)
| ONE FC: Era of Champions
| 
| align=center| 1
| align=center| 4:33
| Jakarta, Indonesia
|  
|-

Muay Thai record (incomplete)

|-  style="background:#cfc;"
| 2010-07-11|| Win||align=left| Oji || Muay Thai Open 12 || Tokyo, Japan || Decision (Unanimous) || 3 ||3:00
|-  style="background:#cfc;"
| 2009-11-28|| Win||align=left| Kojiro || NJKF ROAD TO REAL KING 14 || Tokyo, Japan || TKO  || 2 ||2:44
|-  style="background:#cfc;"
| 2008-10-05|| Win||align=left| Yuzo Maki || Muay Thai Open 5 || Tokyo, Japan || KO (Right Hook) || 3 ||0:39
|-  style="background:#cfc;"
| 2008-07-27|| Win||align=left| Hiroki Maeda || NJKF START OF NEW LEGEND IX || Tokyo, Japan || KO (Right High Kick) || 2 ||2:37
|-  style="background:#cfc;"
| 2007-07-29|| Win||align=left| Kunitaka || NJKF Fighting Evolution IX Muay Thai Open || Tokyo, Japan || Decision (Unanimous) || 5 ||3:00
|-  style="background:#cfc;"
| 2006-01-14 || Win||align=left| || Omnoi Stadium || Samut Sakhon || Decision || 5 || 3:00
|-
! colspan="8" style="background:white" |
|-  style="background:#fbb;"
| 2005-07-12|| Loss||align=left| Denchiangkwan Laemthong|| Lumpinee Stadium || Bangkok, Thailand || Decision || 5 || 3:00
|-  style="background:#cfc;"
| 2005-04-12|| Win||align=left| Denchiangkwan Laemthong|| Lumpinee Stadium || Bangkok, Thailand || Decision || 5 || 3:00
|-  style="background:#cfc;"
| 2004-12-16|| Win||align=left| Kulabdaeng Por Pinyo|| Rajadamnern Stadium || Bangkok, Thailand || Decision || 5 || 3:00
|-  style="background:#fbb;"
| 2004-10-01|| Loss||align=left| Runganan Sor.Jor.Suwit|| Lumpinee Stadium || Bangkok, Thailand || Decision || 5 || 3:00
|-  style="background:#fbb;"
| 2004-08-07|| Loss||align=left| Yoksila Kiatprasarnchai|| Lumpinee Stadium || Bangkok, Thailand || Decision || 5 || 3:00
|-  style="background:#cfc;"
| 2004-06-22|| Win||align=left| Newpetch Buamuang Rueangkit|| Lumpinee Stadium || Bangkok, Thailand || Decision || 5 || 3:00
|-  style="background:#fbb;"
| 2004-03-12 || Loss||align=left| Jomyut Phitakruchaiden || Lumpinee Stadium || Bangkok, Thailand || Decision || 5 || 3:00
|-  style="background:#fbb;"
| 2004-01-23 || Loss||align=left| Hanchai Kiatyongyuth || Lumpinee Stadium || Bangkok, Thailand || Decision || 5 || 3:00

|-  style="background:#fbb;"
| 2003-12-09 || Loss||align=left| Suwitlek Sit-Ubon || Lumpinee Stadium || Bangkok, Thailand || Decision || 5 || 3:00

|-  style="background:#fbb;"
| 2003-08-16 || Loss||align=left| Saensuk Por Kaewsen||  || Yala province, Thailand || Decision || 5 || 3:00
|-  style="background:#fbb;"
| 2002-06-11 || Loss||align=left| Panomroonglek Kiatmuu9|| Lumpinee Stadium || Bangkok, Thailand || Decision || 5 || 3:00
|-  style="background:#fbb;"
| 2002-05-18 || Loss||align=left| Panomroonglek Kiatmuu9|| Lumpinee Stadium || Bangkok, Thailand || Decision || 5 || 3:00
|-  style="background:#c5d2ea;"
| 2002-01-05 || Draw||align=left| Rittidet Maimankon || Lumpinee Stadium || Bangkok, Thailand || Decision || 5 || 3:00
|-  style="background:#fbb;"
| 2001-08-21 || Loss||align=left| Yodsanklai Fairtex || Lumpinee Stadium || Bangkok, Thailand || Decision || 5 || 3:00
|-  style="background:#cfc;"
| 2001-04-06 || Win||align=left| Chawalit Sit.Or || Lumpinee Stadium || Bangkok, Thailand || KO|| 1 || 
|-  style="background:#cfc;"
| 2000-08-13 || Win||align=left| Namkabuanlek Nongkeepahuyuth ||  || Thailand || Decision || 5 || 3:00
|-  style="background:#fbb;"
| 1999-06-26 || Loss||align=left| Chatchainoi Sitbenjam || Lumpinee Stadium || Bangkok, Thailand || Decision || 5 || 3:00
|-  style="background:#cfc;"
| 1999-05-02 || Win||align=left| Thailandlek Kiatratchawat||  || Bangkok, Thailand || Decision || 5 || 3:00
|-  style="background:#cfc;"
| 1998-11-16 || Win||align=left| Khunkrai Srisinthorn || Rajadamnern Stadium || Bangkok, Thailand || Decision || 5 || 3:00
|-
| colspan=9 | Legend:

See also
List of current ONE fighters

References

Notes

External links

1978 births
Living people
Dejdamrong Sor Amnuaysirichoke
Strawweight mixed martial artists
Flyweight mixed martial artists
Mixed martial artists utilizing Muay Thai
Mixed martial artists utilizing Brazilian jiu-jitsu
Dejdamrong Sor Amnuaysirichoke
Dejdamrong Sor Amnuaysirichoke
Featherweight kickboxers
Dejdamrong Sor Amnuaysirichoke
ONE Championship champions